James Kenyon (18 January 1888 – 1949) was an English footballer who played as a centre forward for Stockport County, Glossop and Bradford Park Avenue, as well as non-league football for various other clubs. He also played Cricket for Old Glossop.

References 

English footballers
Glossop North End A.F.C. players
Stockport County F.C. players
Bradford (Park Avenue) A.F.C. players
Rochdale A.F.C. players
Millwall F.C. players
Ashton United F.C. players
1888 births
1949 deaths